Qingshui Town is a town located on the western end of Mentougou District, Beijing, China. It shares border with Zhuolu and Huailai Counties in the north, Zhaitang Town in the east, Shijiaying and Xiayunling Townships in the south, and Laishui County in the west. The population of Qingshui was 6,025 as of 2020.

The town takes its name Qingshui from the QIngshui River, which is originated from this town.

History

Administrative Divisions 
As of 2021, Qingshui Town was made up of 32 villages:

See also 

 List of township-level divisions of Beijing

References 

Mentougou District
Towns in Beijing